Rzepiennik Strzyżewski  is a village in Tarnów County, Lesser Poland Voivodeship, in southern Poland. It is the seat of the gmina (administrative district) called Gmina Rzepiennik Strzyżewski.

The village has a population of 1,400.

References

External links
 Jewish Community in Rzepiennik Strzyżewski on Virtual Shtetl

Villages in Tarnów County